J. Todd Anderson is a storyboard artist who has worked with a number of filmmakers, including the Coen brothers. He also, along with film archivist and friend George Willeman and WYSO D.J. Niki Dakota, produces Filmically Perfect. He made his directorial debut in 1998 with the film The Naked Man. A few years later, he served as second unit director on the Coen brothers' Intolerable Cruelty, which earned him membership in the Directors Guild of America.

Anderson received credit for appearing in Fargo as "Victim in Field". Instead of his name being used, he was credited with the symbol for the artist formerly known as Prince, which was turned on its side and a smiley face drawn in the circle. In addition, his name was used in the 2010 film True Grit as one of the many aliases for the outlaw Tom Chaney.

Storyboard
Anderson has stated that his role as storyboard artist is "less creative than interpretive". When working with Ethan and Joel Coen, the Coens go through the movie shot by shot, and Anderson works to "establish the scale, trap the angle, ID the character, get the action". Afterwards he sits and does a more polished drawing from the sketches drawn with the directors. After getting feedback from the filmmakers and adding several details, such as facial expressions, necessary props and arrows depicting actor and camera movement, the drawings are photocopied and given to everyone on the set. Thus, the storyboards Anderson creates are vital to the smooth process and good communication on the film set. 

Anderson has contributed to and been credited for the storyboards of the following films:

Pop opera
Anderson has written the words and music for a pop opera entitled Nativity. It tells the story of the birth of Jesus through the eyes of angels. First performed in Dayton, Ohio in 1995, the show was not performed again until 2008. Anderson cites his influences on the piece being rock operas such as Tommy and Jesus Christ Superstar as well as gospel musicals.

Notes

Living people
American storyboard artists
Year of birth missing (living people)